G. B. Samuelson Productions was a British film production company which operated in the silent film and early sound film era of films during the period of 1914 to 1933, during which time the company produced around 70 films. The company was run by G.B. Samuelson, who also directed a number of films.

The company also made several films under the names British-Super films and Napoleon Films.

Filmography
This list is incomplete. You can help by expanding it.
A Study in Scarlet (1914)
Infelice (1915)
The Valley of Fear (1916)
Just a Girl (1916)
 Dr. Wake's Patient (1916)
 Damaged Goods (1919)
 The Bridal Chair (1919)

Bibliography
 Bamford, Kenton. Distorted Images: British National Identity and Film in the 1920s (I. B. Tauris, 1999)

External links
G. B. Samuelson Productions at IMDB

British film studios
Film production companies of the United Kingdom
Samuelson family